Bud, Sweat and Beers is the debut studio album released by English rapper Devlin, via Island Records and the Universal Music Group. The album was released on 29 October 2010 via digital download, and 1 November 2010, physically. The album was produced by Labrinth, Kraze, Lewi White, Futurecut and Naughty Boy. Featured guests on the album include Awa Manneh, Hikaru Utada, Labrinth, Emeli Sandé, Yasmin, Dogzilla and Ghetts. The album received high praise in critical reviews, and was awarded Hottest Album of the Week by Zane Lowe.

Singles
"Shot Music" was released as a promotional single on 9 April 2010. The track features vocals from fellow rapper Giggs. The track did not make the final album cut, but did feature on the album's original sampler, issued to radio stations and critics in September 2010. A music video was recorded. "London City" was released as a promotional single on 3 June 2010. The track, which features a sample from Hikaru Utada's song "Passion (After the Battle)", peaked at #181 on the UK Singles Chart, and a music video for the track was filmed and released to music channels. "Brainwashed" was released on 8 August 2010 as the first official single from the album. The track features vocals from British singer-songwriter Awa Manneh. The single went on to debut at #31 on the UK Singles Chart, after being included on the BBC Radio 1 B-list playlist. "Runaway" was released on 24 October 2010 as the second official single from the album. The track features vocals from upcoming British singer-songwriter and DJ Yasmin. The single went on to debut at #16 on the UK Singles Chart, after being included on the BBC Radio 1 A-list playlist. "Let It Go" was released on 24 January 2011 as the third and final official single from the album. The track features vocals from British-producer Labrinth. The single went on to debut at #59 on the UK Singles Chart, after being included on the BBC Radio 1 A-list playlist.

Track listing

Charts

Release history

References 

2010 debut albums
Devlin (rapper) albums
Island Records albums
Albums produced by Naughty Boy
Albums produced by Labrinth